The Venerable  (Anthony) Basil Carter  (27 April 1881 – 14 March 1942) was Archdeacon of Cleveland from 1938 until his death.

The son of The Rev. Charles Clement Carter, he was educated at Trinity College, Dublin. Carter was a teacher from 1900 to 1907 when he entered Ripon College Cuddesdon. After curacies in Battersea and Armley he was a Chaplain to the Forces from 1916 to 1917. He held incumbencies in Leeds (1917–1922); Ilkley (1922–1930); Scarborough (1930–1936); and Stokesley (1936–1938).

References

Alumni of Trinity College Dublin
Alumni of Ripon College Cuddesdon
Archdeacons of Cleveland
1942 deaths
1881 births